Blurton is a district in the south of Stoke on Trent, in the English county of Staffordshire. Hollybush, Old Blurton, Blurton Farm and Newstead are the names of the areas in which make up the town known as Blurton.

Education
Sutherland Primary Academy, The Meadows Primary Academy & Newstead Primary Academy provide co-ed learning for pupils up to the age of 11.

Blurton has one co-ed secondary school. Ormiston Sir Stanley Matthews Academy.

Transport
First Potteries, part of the FirstGroup, provides two routes in the town.

The 22 goes from Longton to Newcastle-under-Lyme via Blurton, Trentham, Hanford, Trent Vale and Royal Stoke Hospital and vice versa.

23. This route goes to; Newstead, Blurton, Heron Cross, Fenton, Stoke-upon-Trent, Stoke Rail station, Shelton and Hanley / City Centre and reverse.

Via the local bus service you can get a train via the West Coast Main Line to Manchester and London etc.
There are also Intercity trains going to places such as Birmingham, Birmingham international (for Birmingham airport and the NEC) with some services going on to Cardiff or the south coast and intermediate stations. The Crewe Derby line which serves both Longton and Stoke is now running trains to Newark Castle via Nottingham.

Politics 
Stoke-on-Trent city council is  Conservative held. Blurton is situated in the Stoke-on-Trent South parliamentary constituency, formerly a Labour stronghold it is now the seat of Jack Brereton of the Conservative party. All three of the city councillors covering the wards of Blurton are Tories.

References

Areas of Stoke-on-Trent
Villages in Staffordshire